The 1981 Royal Bank of Scotland World Women's Curling Championship, the women's world curling championship, was held from 16 to 21 March at the Perth Ice Arena in Perth, Scotland.

Teams

Round-robin standings

Round-robin results

Draw 1

Draw 2

Draw 3

Draw 4

Draw 5

Draw 6

Draw 7

Draw 8

Draw 9

Playoffs

Semifinals

Final

External links

World Women's Curling Championship
1981 in women's curling
Sport in Perth, Scotland
Women's curling competitions in Scotland
1981 in Scottish sport
March 1981 sports events in the United Kingdom
International curling competitions hosted by Scotland
1981 in Scottish women's sport